Jesus Fabián Anguamea (born December 21, 1993) is a Mexican professional baseball pitcher for the Tigres de Quintana Roo of the Mexican League. He played for the Mexico national baseball team in the 2020 Summer Olympics.

Career

Diablos Rojos del México
On June 5, 2013, Anguamea signed with the Diablos Rojos del México of the Mexican League. He made his professional debut that season, pitching in 10 games and recording a 5.73 ERA. The following season, Anguamea struggled to a 6.92 ERA in 8 games for the team. In 2015, he pitched to a 3.58 ERA in 22 appearances. The next year, Anguamea pitched in 17 games for México, logging an 0-1 record and 5.70 ERA with 26 strikeouts in 30.0 innings of work. For the 2017 season, Anguamea pitched to a 5-2 record and 4.29 ERA in 27 appearances. In 2018, Anguamea 23 games for the team, posting a 3-3 record with 61 strikeouts in 58.1 innings pitched. In 2019, he registered a 6.18 ERA in 31 games for the team. Anguamea did not play in a game in 2020 due to the cancellation of the Mexican League season because of the COVID-19 pandemic. In 7 games for the team in 2021, Anguamea struggled to a 10.00 ERA with 9 strikeouts in as many innings.

Tigres de Quintana Roo
On June 15, 2021, Anguamea was traded to the Tigres de Quintana Roo along with Octavio Acosta and Carlos De Leon in exchange for Luis Ivan Rodriguez.

International career
Anguamea was selected to the Mexico national baseball team for the 2020 Summer Olympics (contested in July 2021), as a replacement for Sammy Solís, who tested positive for COVID-19.

References

External links

Living people
1993 births
People from Ciudad Obregón
Baseball players from Sonora
Mexican League baseball pitchers
Diablos Rojos del México players
Yaquis de Obregón players
Tigres de Quintana Roo players
Baseball players at the 2020 Summer Olympics
Olympic baseball players of Mexico